Balizhuang Subdistrict is a subdistrict on the south of Haidian District, Beijing, China. It borders Shuguang and Zizhuyuan Subdistricts in its north, Ganjiakou Subdistrict in its east, Wanshou Road Subdistrict in its south, and Tiancun Road Subdistrict in its west. In 2020 it had a total population of 133,400. The subdistrict was created in 1963.

Administrative Divisions 
In 2021, Balizhuang Subdistrict consisted of 32 communities:

See also 

 List of township-level divisions of Beijing

References 

Haidian District
Subdistricts of Beijing